Hypochnus is a genus of fungi. The original treatment of the genus by Elias Magnus Fries included various wholly unrelated species, therefore it is now considered a nomen ambiguum, with the type species H. ferrugineus assigned to Tomentella.

Species
 Hypochnus anthochrous ((Pers: Fr) Fr, 1863)
 Hypochnus chlorinus (Massee, 1901) 
 Hypochnus cinerascens (P.Karst, 1888)
 Hypochnus cucumeris (A.B.Frank, 1883)
 Hypochnus ferrugineus
 Hypochnus fuciformis (McAlpine, 1906)
 Hypochnus fuscus 
 Hypochnus fusisporus (J.Schrot., 1888)
 Hypochnus ochroleucus (Noack, 1898) - a plant pathogen
 Hypochnus olivaceus (Fr. : Fr., 1828)

References

Thelephorales
Thelephorales genera